475th may refer to:

475th Air Base Wing, inactive United States Air Force unit
475th Bombardment Squadron, inactive United States Air Force unit
475th Fighter Group, World War II predecessor of 53d Weapons Evaluation Group
475th Test Squadron, inactive United States Air Force unit

See also
475 (number)
475, the year 475 (CDLXXV) of the Julian calendar
475 BC